Devine Independent School District is a public school district based in Devine, Texas (USA).

Located in Medina County, a portion of the district extends into Frio County.

In 2009, the school district was rated "academically acceptable" by the Texas Education Agency.

Schools
Devine High (Grades 9-12)
Devine Middle (Grades 6-8)
Devine Intermediate (Grades 3-5)
John J. Ciavarra Elementary (Grades PK-2)

References

External links
 

School districts in Medina County, Texas
School districts in Frio County, Texas